Laviai Nielsen (born 13 March 1996) is a British sprinter specialising in the 400 metres. She won several medals as a member of the Great Britain 4x400 metres relay teams, including silver at the 2017 World Championships and bronze at the 2022 World Championships.

In 2015, she took gold medal in the 400 m at the European Junior Championships

Nielsen has an identical twin sister, Lina Nielsen, who is also an international athlete in the same events.

In August 2022, Laviai disclosed that she had been diagnosed with multiple sclerosis in the summer of 2021. Her twin sister, Lina, had revealed that she was suffering from the same condition two weeks earlier, having been diagnosed in 2013, when she was 17. As MS has a genetic element, Lavaia was considered to be at higher risk of the illness following Lina's diagnosis.

Early life
Nielsen grew up in Leytonstone, East London. At 16, she was a bag carrier for British heptathlete Jessica Ennis at the 2012 London Olympics, a pivotal experience in her development as an athlete. "I stood behind Jessica Ennis and when she came out the crowd cheering was the loudest thing I've heard in my life," she later recalled. "I thought, 'I want that'."

, she was taking a year out from her geography degree at King's College London. Nielsen is an Athlete Ambassador for sport for development charity, Right to Play..

Career

2011-19
Nielsen was initially a middle distance runner, but in 2013 she and her twin sister were approached at an event and persuaded to change specialism to the 400 metres. Laviai proceeded to reduce her 400m personal best by 2 seconds within 2 months, and a further four seconds by the following season.

Nielsen's breakthrough year came in 2015, when she won gold in the 400 metres at the 2015 European Junior Championships in Sweden. She topped this off by running the final leg for the winning 4 x 400 metres relay team, with her sister Lina running the second leg. Nielsen also lowered her personal best to 52.25s, the British junior's third-fastest performance of all time and the fastest time since 33 years. She finished the season ranked number 2 in the UK. This success earned Nielsen a place on the Jaguar Land Rover Academy of Sport programme, which offers financial support and mentoring.

In February 2017, she recorded a personal best of 51.90s at an indoor meet in Birmingham. In the summer, she reached the final of the 400 metres at the 2017 European Indoor Championships in Belgrade, finishing fourth to miss out on a bronze medal by just 0.27 seconds. On the final day of the championships, she ran the anchor leg of the 4 x 400 metre relay, winning the silver medal behind a strong Polish team.

2020-present
She became a double British champion when successfully defending her 400 metres title at the 2020 British Athletics Championships in a time of 51.72 secs.

In December 2021, Nielsen had her lottery funding removed by UK Athletics after she refused to stop working directly with coach Rana Reider, with UK Athletics saying: "any athlete working directly with Rana Reider, given the confirmed complaints of sexual misconduct against him from US Safe Sport, will not be able to be supported through the World Class Programme." Nielsen returned to the Olympic relay funding stream at the end of 2022.

Achievements

International competitions

References

External links

 

1996 births
Living people
People from Leytonstone
Athletes from London
British female sprinters
English female sprinters
British identical twins
World Athletics Championships athletes for Great Britain
World Athletics Championships medalists
British Athletics Championships winners
Black British sportswomen
Athletes (track and field) at the 2020 Summer Olympics
Olympic athletes of Great Britain
European Athletics Championships medalists